UPSA may refer to :
 United Provinces of South America
 The University of the Philippines Singing Ambassadors
 Pontifical University of Salamanca, in Spain
Union de pharmacologie scientifique appliquée, French pharmaceutical group 1935-1994
 University of California, San Diego Performance-Based Skills Assessment, cognitive test